Fight Valley is a 2016 action film directed by Rob Hawk. It stars Susie Celek, as well as mixed martial artists Miesha Tate, Holly Holm, and Cris Cyborg.

Plot 

Twenty-two year old Tori Coro gets involved in an underground fighting ring in a rough section of Camden, NJ. When her bruised and beaten body is found abandoned in the woods, rumors begin to swirl that Tori died in Fight Valley, an unofficial neighborhood where fighters go to make money. Tori's sister Windsor moves to town to start her own investigation. Jabs, a respected fighter turned gym owner, agrees to train Windsor as she prepares to come face to face with Tori's killer and fight for justice

Cast

Susie Celek as Windsor
Miesha Tate as Jabs
Cris Cyborg as Church
Cabrina Collesides as Jamie
Erin O'Brien as Duke 
Kari J. Kramer as Yanni
Chelsea Durkalec as Tori Coro
Amanda Serrano as Vivian
Holly Holm as Payton Walsh
Katlyn Chookagian as Parking Lot Fighter
Ivy LaShawn Coleman as Gracey

Release
The film was signed by Philadelphia-based distributor Breaking Glass Pictures and released in July 2016.

Reception 

The film gained a mixed reception from critics.

References

External links
 
 

2016 films
2016 action films
2016 martial arts films
American martial arts films
American action films
2010s English-language films
Martial arts tournament films
Mixed martial arts films
Films shot in New Jersey
2010s American films